Jondal is a former municipality in the old Hordaland county, Norway. The  municipality existed from 1863 until its dissolution in 2020 when it became part of Ullensvang Municipality in Vestland county. It was located on the Folgefonna peninsula in the Hardanger district, on the eastern shore of the Hardangerfjorden. The administrative centre of the municipality was the village of Jondal. Other villages in Jondal include Herand, Kysnesstranda, and Torsnes.

Prior to its dissolution in 2020, the  municipality is the 305th largest by area out of the 422 municipalities in Norway. Jondal is the 386th most populous municipality in Norway with a population of 1,108.

In 2016, the chief of police for Vestlandet formally suggested a reconfiguration of police districts and stations. He proposed that the police station in Jondal be closed.

General information

{{Historical populations
|footnote = Source: Statistics Norway.
|shading = off
|align= left
|1951|1871
|1960|1744
|1970|1268
|1980|1273
|1990|1266
|2000|1151
|2010|1036
|2019|1108
}}
The municipality of Jondal was established on 1 January 1863 when it was separated from the large municipality of Strandebarm. Initially, Jondal had a population of 1,663.

During the 1960s, there were many municipal mergers across Norway due to the work of the Schei Committee. On 1 January 1965, there were two changes that effected Jondal municipality: the part of Jondal located on the northwestern side of the Hardangerfjorden (population: 515) was transferred to Kvam Municipality and the Kysnesstranda area of Strandebarm municipality (population: 100) was transferred to Jondal.

Then on 1 January 2013, the southwestern part of the Folgefonna peninsula (south of Kysnesstranda) was transferred to Jondal from the neighboring Kvinnherad Municipality.

On 1 January 2020, the three neighboring municipalities of Jondal, Odda, and Ullensvang were merged. The new municipality was named Ullensvang and its administrative centre is the town of Odda.

Name
The municipality is named after the Jondalen valley in which the village of Jondal sits. The Old Norse form of the name was Jónardalr. The first element is an old rivername Jón (now called Jondalselvi) and the last element is dalr'' which means "valley" or "dale". The meaning of the rivername is unknown.

Coat of arms
The coat of arms was granted on 27 November 1987. The arms are red with three gold-colored boat hooks. This design was chosen to symbolise the importance of sailing and shipping along the Hardangerfjord. Historically, Jondal has been known for its shipyards and sailing college.

Churches
The Church of Norway has one parish within the municipality of Jondal. It is part of the Hardanger og Voss prosti (deanery) in the Diocese of Bjørgvin.

Geography
Jondal was located on the southeast side of the Hardangerfjorden on the Folgefonna peninsula. It is bounded by the large Folgefonna glacier to the southeast (inside Folgefonna National Park). The lake Juklavatnet is located on the municipal border with Kvinnherad.

Government

Municipal council
The municipal council  of Jondal was made up of 17 representatives that were elected to four year terms. The party breakdown of the final municipal council was as follows:

Notable residents
Herborg Kråkevik, a singer and actress
Bjørg Hope Galtung, the mayor of Jondal from 1979 to 1993 (only leaving to sit in the national Parliament)

See also
List of former municipalities of Norway

References

External links

Municipal fact sheet from Statistics Norway 

 
Ullensvang
Former municipalities of Norway
1863 establishments in Norway
2020 disestablishments in Norway